Dragana Gladovic (Serbian Cyrillic: Драгана Гладовић, born 27 July 1992 in Šabac) is a Serbian taekwondo practitioner. At the 2012 Summer Olympics, she competed in the Taekwondo at the 2012 Summer Olympics – Women's 57 kg, but was defeated in the first round.

References

Serbian female taekwondo practitioners
1992 births
Living people
Sportspeople from Šabac
Olympic taekwondo practitioners of Serbia
Taekwondo practitioners at the 2012 Summer Olympics
Taekwondo practitioners at the 2015 European Games
European Games competitors for Serbia
Universiade medalists in taekwondo
Universiade bronze medalists for Serbia
Medalists at the 2015 Summer Universiade
21st-century Serbian women